Ramlati Ali (born 28 May 1961) is a French politician who served as Member of Parliament for Mayotte's 1st constituency from 2018 to 2022. She was elected as a Socialist candidate in a 2018 by-election but sits in the En Marche group in the National Assembly.

She became the first female doctor in Mayotte in 1996.

References 

1961 births
Living people
Socialist Party (France) politicians
La République En Marche! politicians
Deputies of the 15th National Assembly of the French Fifth Republic
Deputies from Mayotte
Black French politicians
Mayotte politicians
21st-century French women politicians
21st-century French politicians
French women physicians
Women members of the National Assembly (France)